MAX is a bus rapid transit (BRT) service operated by Utah Transit Authority (UTA) along the Wasatch Front in Utah, United States. It is described by UTA as "light rail on rubber tires". As of January 2023, there is one line in service in Utah County, one discontinued line in Salt Lake County, two new routes planned for Salt Lake County, and one under construction in Weber County.

Description
MAX has service improvements that differ from regular bus service, such as Transit Signal Priority (TSP), increased spacing between stops, high-frequency service, and improved stops. MAX lines have limited stops (often at major transfer points). Whenever reasonably possible, MAX operates along dedicated busways, separated from regular traffic. The busways are more than just a bus lane, since all other traffic is prohibited from using the guideways, including other UTA buses. The first such busways was built in West Valley City on 3500 South from 3600 West to 2700 West. 

Another characteristic that distinguishes MAX from regular bus service is that it does not have a set schedule for all of its stops (although there are estimated times for arrival). MAX leaves its first stop and travels as fast as legally and safely possible to the end of the line.

The first MAX line (3500 South MAX) opened on July 14, 2008.

Another feature of MAX is that passengers may enter the unique buses by any door and do not have to show proof of fare to the driver upon boarding. Although fare payment (including the use bus tokens) can be made at the farebox upon boarding the front of the MAX bus, MAX stations also have a ticket vending machine that accepts cash or credit cards. Fares are enforced through random checks by UTA Transit Police, the same way as they are on streetcars, TRAX, and the FrontRunner. The fare for MAX is the same as for local bus service or TRAX and, like TRAX and FrontRunner tickets, MAX tickets also serve as a transfer to other UTA modes of transit.

MAX lines

Current MAX lines

Utah Valley Express

The initial route (Phase I) for the BRT line begins at the Orem Station and heads east on University Parkway (SR-265/1300 South) to pass by the south side of the UVU campus. After passing along the south side of the University Mall, it will head southeast toward Provo and the junction of University Parkway and University Avenue (US-189). It will then connect with a stop on the southeast side of BYU campus by continuing east along University Parkway. It will then loop around the east side of BYU campus on North 900 East before returning to, and heading south along University Avenue. It will then stop at the Provo Station before passing by the Provo Towne Centre mall, making a loop through the East Bay Business Park, and finally retracing its route back to the Orem Intermodal Center.

In Phase II, the west end of the BRT line will be rerouted directly east from the Orem Station along 800 South and connect with the UVU campus by way of a high-occupancy/toll (HOT) interchange overpass. It will then pass by the north and east edges of UVU before reaching University Parkway and continuing along the remainder of its original route. Along with the reroute, the single MAX station on the south side of the UVU campus will be replaced by three new stations along the east and north sides of campus."

Future MAX lines

A MAX line is under construction in Ogden and another is planned along 5600 West in Salt Lake County. Studies for the feasibility of BRT are also being conducted areas in the Taylorsville/Murray area (4700 South) and the Holladay/Cottonwood Heights area (Wasatch Boulevard) and other areas. BRT lines are also being considered for Davis County. and along 5400 South, 12600 South, Redwood Road, State Street, and Highland Drive. On July 8, 2014, Davis County unanimously approved a resolution in support of a BRT route connecting downtown Salt Lake City with Bountiful.

Ogden Express

The Ogden Express (OGX) is a  BRT project that is under construction and will connect the Ogden Intermodal Transit Center with the Weber State University (WSU) and McKay-Dee Hospital in southern Ogden. It will include  of exclusive bus lanes and initially have thirteen stations, with three more potential stations. The anticipated route will begin in the Ogden Intermodal Transit Center in west–central Ogden. It will then run east on 23rd Street to Washington Boulevard (U.S. Route 89) before turning south along that street. It will then head east again on 25th Street to Harrison Boulevard (Utah State Route 203) and turn south again along that street. After passing the Ogden High School, beginning at about 31st Street, the route will transition to bus–only lanes in the center of the road. At about 37th Street, the route will shift east, off Harrison Boulevard and onto the main campus of WSU, and continue south, initially along Dixon Parkway (Utah State Route 284). Near the roundabout with East 3850 South Street/University Circle, the route will shift farther east along new roadway (but still in busonly lanes) to continue south, passing just west of exiting campus buildings. South of the residential buildingx, the route will continue on new busway to pass through an existing residential areauntil it reaches the existing parking lot for the Dee Events Center. After passing just west of the Events Center, the route will turn northeast and transition back to mixed-traffic to cross Harrison Boulevard and head easterly on Oakcrest Drive. Finally, the route will loop counterclockwise around the McKay-Dee Hospital parking lot, before returning along the same route to the Ogden Intermodal Transit Center. Depending on funding, the project is expected to be completed 2023.

5600 West MAX

As part of the Mountain View Corridor Project a BRT line, the 5600 West MAX, will be built along 5600 West (SR-172/SR-134) in Salt Lake County. This project has three phases. Phase I will include BRT service along 5600 West between 6200 South (Bennion Boulevard) in Kearns and 2700 South in West Valley City. Upon reaching 2700 South it will then connect with Downtown Salt Lake City (including the via 2700 North, Bangerter Highway, 21st South Freeway, and I-15. Phase II will extend BRT service further south through West Jordan to 11800 South in South Jordan and further north to I-80 and the Salt Lake City International Airport.  (This Phase II extension would also included connections with the Airport, 5600 W Old Bingham Hwy, South Jordan Parkway, and Daybreak Parkway stations.)  However, in Phase III it is anticipated that the entire 5600 West MAX will be replaced by a TRAX line along the same right of way.

Murray Taylorsville MAX 

The Murray Taylorsville MAX is a BRT project that is anticipated to connect the Murray City Center with the Murray Central Station and the main campus of Salt Lake Community College (SLCC) in Taylorsville with nine stations along the way. The anticipated route will begin in the Murray City Center, north of the Intermountain Medical Center. It will then run west along Vine Street (5090 South) to Murray Boulevard, connecting with the Murray Central Station along the way. It will then head roughly northwest to 4500 South (SR-226) along the following streets: Murray Boulevard, Murray-Taylorsville Road (4800 South), Sunstone Road, and Atherton Drive. Heading west along 4500 South, in dedicated lanes, it will then turn north along Redwood Road (SR-68) until in reaches the SLCC campus. The hope is, depending on funding, to have the Murray Taylorsville MAX completed by 2016.

Former MAX lines

3500 South MAX

It was the first of several BRT lines that UTA is planning for the Salt Lake Valley and Utah County. Costs for the project totaled $17 million; a light rail extension along the same route would have cost $100 million. Original plans were to discontinue MAX service between the Millcreek and West Valley Central TRAX Stations once the West Valley extension of the TRAX Green Line was completed. However, even though the Green Line began service in August 2011, as of May 2014, service between the two TRAX stations still continued. The 3500 South MAX ran Monday through Saturday (no Sunday service) from about 6:00 am to midnight (every fifteen minutes on weekdays and every half-hour on Saturdays). It was permanently discontinued on August 7, 2022, after a year of being temporarily suspended due to the COVID-19 pandemic.

Notes

References

External links

 Bus Rapid Transit fact sheet
 Official UTA website
 Official UTA BRT website

Bus rapid transit in Utah
Transportation in Salt Lake County, Utah
Transportation in Utah County, Utah
2008 introductions
2017 introductions
2023 introductions